The early Buddhist schools are those schools into which the Buddhist monastic saṅgha split early in the history of Buddhism. The divisions were originally due to differences in Vinaya and later also due to doctrinal differences and geographical separation of groups of monks. The original saṅgha split into the first early schools (generally believed to be the Sthavira nikāya and the Mahāsāṃghika) during or after the reign of Aśoka. Later, these first early schools were further divided into schools such as the Sarvāstivādins, the Dharmaguptakas, and the Vibhajyavāda, and ended up numbering 18 or 20 schools according to traditional accounts. 

The textual material shared by the early schools is often termed the Early Buddhist Texts and these are an important source for understanding their doctrinal similarities and differences.

Formation and development

The first council 

According to the scriptures (Cullavagga XI.1 ff), three months after the parinirvana of Gautama Buddha, a council was held at Rajagaha Rajgir) by some of his disciples who had attained arahantship, presided over by Mahākāśyapa, one of his most senior disciples, and with the support of king Ajātasattu, reciting the teachings of the Buddha. The accounts of the council in the scriptures of the schools differ as to what was actually recited there. Purāṇa is recorded as having said: "Your reverences, well chanted by the elders are the Dhamma and Vinaya, but in that way that I heard it in the Lord's presence, that I received it in his presence, in that same way will I bear it in mind." [Vinaya-pitaka: Cullavagga XI:1:11]. According to Theravāda tradition, the teachings were divided into various parts and each was assigned to an elder and his pupils to commit to memory, and there was no conflict about what the Buddha taught.

Some scholars argue that the first council actually did not take place.

Divergence between the Sthaviravāda and the Mahāsāṃghika
The expansion of orally transmitted texts in early Buddhism, and the growing distances between Buddhist communities, fostered specialization and sectarian identification. One or several disputes did occur during Aśoka's reign, involving both doctrinal and disciplinary (vinaya) matters, although these may have been too informal to be called a "council". The Sthavira school had, by the time of Aśoka, divided into three sub-schools, doctrinally speaking, but these did not become separate monastic orders until later.

Only two ancient sources (the Dīpavaṃsa and Bhavya's third list) place the first schism before Aśoka, and none attribute the schism to a dispute on Vinaya practice. Lamotte and Hirakawa both maintain that the first schism in the Buddhist sangha occurred during the reign of Ashoka. According to scholar Collett Cox "most scholars would agree that even though the roots of the earliest recognized groups predate Aśoka, their actual separation did not occur until after his death." According to the Theravada tradition, the split took place at the Second Buddhist council, which took place at Vaishali, approximately one hundred years after Gautama Buddha's parinirvāṇa. While the second council probably was a historical event, traditions regarding the Second Council are confusing and ambiguous. According to the Theravada tradition the overall result was the first schism in the sangha, between the Sthavira nikāya and the Mahāsāṃghika, although it is not agreed upon by all what the cause of this split was. 

The various splits within the monastic organization went together with the introduction and emphasis on Abhidhammic literature by some schools. This literature was specific to each school, and arguments and disputes between the schools were often based on these Abhidhammic writings. However, actual splits were originally based on disagreements on vinaya (monastic discipline), though later on, by about 100 CE or earlier, they could be based on doctrinal disagreement. Pre-sectarian Buddhism, however, did not have Abhidhammic scriptures, except perhaps for a basic framework, and not all of the early schools developed an Abhidhamma literature.

Third council under Aśoka 

Theravādin sources state that, in the 3rd century BCE, a third council was convened under the patronage of Aśoka. Some scholars argue that there are certain implausible features of the Theravādin account which imply that the third council was ahistorical. The remainder consider it a purely Theravāda-Vibhajjavāda council. 

According to the Theravādin account, this council was convened primarily for the purpose of establishing an official orthodoxy. At the council, small groups raised questions about the specifics of the vinaya and the interpretation of doctrine. The chairman of the council, Moggaliputta Tissa, compiled a book, the Kathavatthu, which was meant to refute these arguments. The council sided with Moggaliputta and his version of Buddhism as orthodox; it was then adopted by Emperor Aśoka as his empire's official religion. In Pali, this school of thought was termed Vibhajjavāda, literally "thesis of [those who make] a distinction".

The distinction involved was as to the existence of phenomena (dhammas) in the past, future and present. The version of the scriptures that had been established at the third council, including the Vinaya, Sutta and the Abhidhamma Pitakas (collectively known as the "Tripiṭaka"), was taken to Sri Lanka by Emperor Aśoka's son, the Venerable Mahinda.  There it was eventually committed to writing in the Pali language. The Pāli Canon remains the most complete set of surviving Nikāya scriptures, although the greater part of the Sarvāstivādin canon also survives in Chinese translation, some parts exist in Tibetan translations, and some fragments exist in Sanskrit manuscripts, while parts of various canons (sometimes unidentified), exist in Chinese and fragments in other Indian dialects.

Further divisions 
Around the time of Aśoka that further divisions began to occur within the Buddhist movement and a number of additional schools emerged. Etienne Lamotte divided the mainstream Buddhist schools into three main doctrinal types:
The “personalists”, such as the Pudgalavādin Vātsīputrīyas and Saṃmittīyas
The “realists”, namely the Theravāda and Sarvāstivāda Ābhidharmikas
The “nominalists”, for instance, the Mahāsāṃghika Prajñaptivādins, and possibly non-Abhidharma Sthaviravadins.

One of them was faction of the Sthavira group which called themselves Vibhajjavādins. One part of this group was transmitted to Sri Lanka and to certain areas of southern India, such as Vanavasi in the south-west and the Kañci region in the south-east. This group later ceased to refer to themselves specifically as "Vibhajjavādins", but reverted to calling themselves "Theriyas", after the earlier Theras (Sthaviras).  Still later, at some point prior to the Dipavamsa (4th century), the Pali name Theravāda was adopted and has remained in use ever since for this group.

Other groups included the Sarvāstivāda, the Dharmaguptakas, the Saṃmitīya, and the Pudgalavādins. The Pudgalavādins were also known as Vatsiputrīyas after their putative founder. Later this group became known as the Sammitīya school after one of its subdivisions. It died out around the 9th or 10th century CE.  Nevertheless, during most of the early medieval period, the Sammitīya school was numerically the largest Buddhist group in India, with more followers than all the other schools combined. The Sarvāstivādin school was most prominent in the north-west of India and provided some of the doctrines that would later be adopted by the Mahāyāna. Another group linked to Sarvāstivāda was the Sautrāntika school, which only recognized the authority of the sutras and rejected the abhidharma transmitted and taught by the Vaibhāṣika wing of Sarvāstivāda.  Based on textual considerations, it has been suggested that the Sautrāntikas were actually adherents of Mūlasarvāstivāda. The relation between Sarvāstivāda and  the Mūlasarvāstivāda, however, is unclear. All of these early schools of Nikāya Buddhism eventually came to be known collectively as "the eighteen schools" in later sources. With the exception of the Theravāda, none of these early schools survived beyond the late medieval period by which time several were already long extinct, although a considerable amount of the canonical literature of some of these schools has survived, mainly in Chinese translation. Moreover, the origins of specifically Mahāyāna doctrines may be discerned in the teachings of some of these early schools, in particular in the Mahāsānghika and the Sarvāstivāda.

The schools sometimes split over ideological differences concerning the "real" meaning of teachings in the Sutta Piṭaka, and sometimes over disagreement concerning the proper observance of vinaya. These ideologies became embedded in large works such as the Abhidhammas and commentaries. Comparison of existing versions of the Suttapiṭaka of various sects shows evidence that ideologies from the Abhidhammas sometimes found their way back into the Suttapiṭakas to support the statements made in those Abhidhammas. 

Some of these developments may be seen as later elaborations on the teachings. According to Gombrich, unintentional literalism was a major force for change in the early doctrinal history of Buddhism. This means that texts were interpreted paying too much attention to the precise words used and not enough to the speaker's intention, the spirit of the text. Some later doctrinal developments in the early Buddhist schools show scholastic literalism, which is a tendency to take the words and phrases of earlier texts (maybe the Buddha's own words) in such a way as to read-in distinctions which it was never intended to make.

The eighteen schools 

It is commonly said that there were eighteen schools of Buddhism in this period. What this actually means is more subtle. First, although the word "school" is used, there was not yet an institutional split in the saṅgha. The Chinese traveler Xuanzang observed even when the Mahāyāna were beginning to emerge from this era that monks of different schools would live side by side in dormitories and attend the same lectures. Only the books that they read were different. Secondly, no historical sources can agree what the names of these "eighteen schools" were. The origin of this saying is therefore unclear.

A.K. Warder identified the following eighteen early Buddhist schools (in approximate chronological order): Sthaviravada, Mahasamghika, Vatsiputriya, Ekavyavaharika, Gokulika (a.k.a. Kukkutika, etc.), Sarvastivada, Lokottaravāda, Dharmottariya, Bhadrayaniya, Sammitiya, Sannagarika, Bahusrutiya, Prajnaptivada, Mahisasaka, Haimavata (a.k.a. Kasyapiya), Dharmaguptaka, Caitika, and the Apara and Uttara (Purva) Saila. Warder says that these were the early Buddhist schools as of circa 50 BCE, about the same time that the Pali Canon was first committed to writing and the presumptive origin date of the Theravada sect, though the term 'Theravada' was not used before the fourth century CE.

A hypothetical combined list would be as follows:

New elements

Newly introduced concepts
Some Buddhist concepts that were not existent in the time of pre-sectarian Buddhism are:
 "Building paramis" or paramitas. The ten paramis are described in Theravadin texts of late origin, while the (Mahayana) paramitas are found in the Mahayana Sutras such as the Dasabhumika Sutra and the Surangama Sutra, also of late origin.
 The Bodhisattva vows, which is only found in the Mahayana Sutras.

Newly composed scriptures
In later times, the arguments between the various schools were based in these newly introduced teachings, practices and beliefs, and monks sought to validate these newly introduced teachings and concepts by referring to the older texts (Sutta-pitaka and Vinaya-pitaka). Most often, the various new Abhidhamma and Mahayana teachings were bases for arguments between sects.

Abhidhamma
As the last major division of the canon, the Abhidhamma Pitaka has had a checkered history. It was not accepted as canonical by the Mahasanghika school and several other schools. Another school included most of the Khuddaka Nikaya within the Abhidhamma Pitaka. Also, the Pali version of the Abhidhamma is a strictly Theravada collection, and has little in common with the Abhidhamma works recognized by other Buddhist schools. The various Abhidhamma philosophies of the various early schools have no agreement on doctrine and belong to the period of 'Divided Buddhism' (as opposed to Undivided Buddhism). The earliest texts of the Pali Canon (the Sutta Nipata and parts of the Jataka), together with the first four (and early) Nikayas of the Suttapitaka, have no mention of (the texts of) the Abhidhamma Pitaka. The Abhidhamma is also not mentioned at the report of the First Buddhist Council, directly after the death of the Buddha. This report of the first council does mention the existence of the Vinaya and the five Nikayas (of the Suttapitaka).

Although the literature of the various Abhidhamma Pitakas began as a kind of commentarial supplement upon the earlier teachings in the Suttapitaka, it soon led to new doctrinal and textual developments and became the focus of a new form of scholarly monastic life. The various Abhidhamma works were starting to be composed from about 200 years after the passing away of the Buddha.

Traditionally, it is believed (in Theravadin culture) that the Abhidhamma was taught by Buddha to his late mother who was living in Tavatimsa heaven. However, this is rejected by scholars, who believe that only small parts of the Abhidhamma literature may have been existent in a very early form. Some schools of Buddhism had important disagreements on subjects of Abhidhamma, while having a largely similar Sutta-pitaka and Vinaya-pitaka. The arguments and conflicts between them were thus often on matters of philosophical Abhidhammic origin, not on matters concerning the actual words and teachings of Buddha.

One impetus for composing new scriptures like the Adhidhammas of the various schools, according to some scholars, was that Buddha left no clear statement about the ontological status of the world – about what really exists. Subsequently, later Buddhists have themselves defined what exists and what not (in the Abhidhammic scriptures), leading to disagreements.

Parts of the Khuddaka Nikaya
Oliver Abeynayake has the following to say on the dating of the various books in the Khuddaka Nikaya:
‘The Khuddaka Nikaya can easily be divided into two strata, one being early and the other late. The texts Sutta Nipata, Itivuttaka, Dhammapada, Therigatha (Theragatha), Udana, and Jataka tales belong to the early stratum. The texts Khuddakapatha, Vimanavatthu, Petavatthu, Niddesa, Patisambhidamagga, Apadana, Buddhavamsa and Cariyapitaka can be categorized in the later stratum.’
The texts in the early stratum date from before the second council (earlier than 100 years after Buddha’s parinibbana), while the later stratum is from after the second council, which means they are definitely later additions to the Sutta Pitaka, and that they might not have been the original teachings by the Buddha, but later compositions by disciples.

The original verses of the Jatakas are recognized as being amongst the earliest part of the Canon, but the accompanying (and more famous) Jataka Stories are purely commentarial, an obvious later addition.

Parivara
The Parivara, the last book of the Vinaya Pitaka, is a later addition to the Vinaya Pitaka.

Other later writings
all literature of the Mahayana (the Mahayana Sutras).
all commentarial works (atthakatha) of Theravada and other early Buddhist schools.

Hinayana and Mahāyāna 
Between the 1st century BCE and the 1st century CE, the terms "Mahāyāna" and "Hīnayāna" were first used in writing, in, for example, the Lotus Sutra. The later Mahayana schools may have preserved ideas which were abandoned by the "orthodox" Theravada, such as the Three Bodies doctrine, the idea of consciousness (vijnana) as a continuum, and devotional elements such as the worship of saints. 

Although the various early schools of Buddhism are sometimes loosely classified as "Hīnayāna" in modern times, this is not necessarily accurate. According to Jan Nattier, Mahāyāna never referred to a separate sect of Buddhism (Skt. nikāya), but rather to the set of ideals and doctrines for bodhisattvas. Paul Williams has also noted that the Mahāyāna never had nor ever attempted to have a separate vinaya or ordination lineage from the early Buddhist schools, and therefore each bhikṣu or bhikṣuṇī adhering to the Mahāyāna formally belonged to an early school.

Membership in these nikāyas, or monastic sects, continues today with the Dharmaguptaka nikāya in East Asia, and the Mūlasarvāstivāda nikāya in Tibetan Buddhism. Therefore, Mahāyāna was never a separate rival sect of the early schools. Paul Harrison clarifies that while Mahāyāna monastics belonged to a nikāya, not all members of a nikāya were Mahāyānists. From Chinese monks visiting India, we now know that both Mahāyāna and non-Mahāyāna monks in India often lived in the same monasteries side by side. Additionally, Isabella Onians notes that Mahāyāna works rarely used the term Hīnayāna, typically using the term Śrāvakayāna instead.

The Chinese Buddhist monk and pilgrim Yijing wrote about relationship between the various "vehicles" and the early Buddhist schools in India. He wrote, "There exist in the West numerous subdivisions of the schools which have different origins, but there are only four principal schools of continuous tradition." These schools are namely the Mahāsāṃghika nikāya, Sthavira, Mūlasarvāstivāda and Saṃmitīya nikāyas. Explaining their doctrinal affiliations, he then writes, "Which of the four schools should be grouped with the Mahāyāna or with the Hīnayāna is not determined." That is to say, there was no simple correspondence between a Buddhist monastic sect, and whether its members learn "Hīnayāna" or "Mahāyāna" teachings.

The Chinese pilgrims 
During the first millennium, monks from China such as Faxian, Xuanzang, and Yijing made pilgrimages to India and wrote accounts of their travels when they returned home. These Chinese travel records constitute extremely valuable sources of information concerning the state of Buddhism in India during the early medieval period.

By the time the Chinese pilgrims Xuanzang and Yijing visited India, there were five early Buddhist schools that they mentioned far more frequently than others. They commented that the Sarvāstivāda/Mūlasarvāstivāda, Mahāsāṃghika, and Saṃmitīya were the principal early Buddhist schools still extant in India, along with the Sthavira sect. The Dharmaguptakas continued to be found in Gandhāra and Central Asia, along the Silk Road.

Timeline

See also 
 Atthakavagga and Parayanavagga
 Buddhist Councils
 Early Buddhist Texts
 History of Buddhism
 Index of Buddhism-related articles
 Nikaya Buddhism
 Pyrrhonism
 Rhinoceros Sutra
 Schools of Buddhism
 Secular Buddhism
 Timeline of Buddhism

Notes

References

Sources

 

 
 
 Buswell, Jr., Robert E. (ed.) (2003). Encyclopedia of Buddhism (MacMillan). .

 Cousins, L.S. (1996). "The Dating of the Historical Buddha: A Review Article" in Journal of the Royal Asiatic Society, Series 3, 6.1 (1996): 57–63. Retrieved 29 Nov 2008 from "Indology" at https://www.webcitation.org/5vDULzfTE?url=http://indology.info/papers/cousins/
 

 

 Gombrich, Richard F. (1988; 6th reprint, 2002).  Theravāda Buddhism: A Social History from Ancient Benares to Modern Colombo (London: Routledge). .
 
 Harvey, Peter (1990; 15th printing, 2007). An Introduction to Buddhism: Teachings, History and Practices (Cambridge: Cambridge University Press). .

 
 
 
 
 

 

 Keown, Damien and Charles S Prebish (eds.) (2004). Encyclopedia of Buddhism (London: Routledge).  .

 
 

 
 

 Robinson, Richard H. and Willard L. Johnson (1970; 3rd ed., 1982). The Buddhist Religion: A Historical Introduction (Belmont, CA: Wadsworth Publishing). .

 
 Sects & Sectarianism: The Origins of Buddhist Schools, Santi Forest Monastery, 2006 by Bhikkhu Sujato

 
 Williams, Paul with Anthony Tribe (2000). Buddhist Thought (London: Routledge). .  Retrieved 29 Nov 2008 from "Google Books" at https://books.google.com/books?id=v0Rpvycf1t0C.

Further reading 

 

   .

   .

External links 

 The Sects of the Buddhists. Rhys Davids. T. W. The Journal of the Royal Asiatic Society, 1891. pp. 409–422
Sects & Sectarianism – The origins of Buddhist Schools
 Sources on early Buddhism

 
Nikaya schools
Schools of Buddhism
Early Buddhism